Wakka Wakka, or Waka Waka, people are an Aboriginal Australian community of the state of Queensland.

Name
"Wakka" was assigned the meaning "no" by Western linguists who documented the Wakawaka language. Ethnonyms based on the duplication of the respective words for "no" were said to be markers distinguishing one tribe from another in the area, as is also the case with the adjacent Gubbi Gubbi.

Language

Wakka Wakka language belongs to the Waka–Kabic branch of the Pama-Nyungan languages. Linguistic work by the Presbyterian minister and anthropologist John Mathew and, more recently, by linguists such as Nils Holmer, provided materials that conserved elements of the grammar and vocabularly. Recently efforts have been undertaken to revive the language and preserve it from extinction. Eidsvold State School has worked with community members to rejuvenate Wakka Wakka language by introducing lessons for primary age students. Lachlan Mackenzie (teacher) and Aunty Doris (Eidsvold Wakka Wakka Group) worked in collaboration with Wakka Wakka people local the Eidsvold area.

Country

Their western extension was at the Boyne River, the upper Burnett River, and Mundubbera. They were also present in the areas of Kingaroy, Murgon, and Gayndah.

Native Title
On April 12, 2022, following 25 years of legal battle, Wakka Wakka people were granted Native Title recognition in the form of 114,000 hectares of the Burnett region. Included in the title was Ban Ban Springs, a significant spiritual and cultural site for Wakka Wakka people. Due to the extensive traditional lands occupied by Wakka Wakka people, additional Native Titles are expected to be recognised in the coming years.

History of contact
Many Wakka Wakka and Gubbi Gubbi people – along with many other groups from across Queensland – were shifted on to the Barambah Aboriginal Mission near Murgon in the early 20th century.

This mission later became the town of Cherbourg and is now self-administered by the Cherbourg Aboriginal Shire Council.

Wakka Wakka people have many important sites located throughout their territory, including Ban Ban Springs, Barambah Creek, a sacred area near Maidenwell, and in the foothills of the Bunya Mountains. There are also a number of bora rings which have survived destruction.

In pre-European times, the Wakka Wakka people were one of the many groups that took part in the regular bunya nut feasts at the Bunya Mountains and other large gatherings in other parts of the South Burnett.

Alternative names

 Mungar (Spotted gum tree people)
 Nukunukubara(?)
 Wa:bar. (applied to several tribes)
 Waa
 Waka
 Wakaa
 Wakar, Wakkar, Wackar
 Wakkawakka
 Wakuwuka
 Wapa. (Kabikabi exonym ="inlanders". )
 Woga
 Wogga
 Wuka Wuka

Source:

Notes

Citations

Sources

Further reading
 Extracts from a 1971 interview with Harry Darlow, Wakka Wakka stockman, about his time on Jimbour Station.

Aboriginal peoples of Queensland